Brendan O'Kelly (10 June 1928 – 24 October 2017) was a soccer player who played in the 1940s in the League of Ireland. O'Kelly was an attacking player on the amateur Bohemians of the 1940s. He later went on trial at Wolverhampton Wanderers. O'Kelly represented Ireland at the 1948 Olympic Games scoring Ireland's goal.

Off the field, Brendan was a Harvard University graduate and was appointed chairman of Bord Iascaigh Mhara in 1963.

Honors
 Represented Ireland in 1948 Olympic Games

External links
O'Kelly at the Olympic Games

References

1928 births
2017 deaths
League of Ireland players
Bohemian F.C. players
Republic of Ireland association footballers
Footballers at the 1948 Summer Olympics
Olympic footballers of Ireland
Harvard University alumni
League of Ireland XI players
Association football forwards